Vera Lischka (born 1 May 1977 in Linz, Upper Austria) is a former breaststroke swimmer from Austria, who competed for her native country at the 1996 Summer Olympics in Atlanta, Georgia. At the European SC Championships 1996, she won the European title in the 50m Breaststroke.

Lischka won thirteen Austrian titles, and was trained by Rolf Gläser. After her swimming career she studied journalism. Since 27 October 2003, she is in the Landtag of Oberösterreich for the SPÖ.

References
 sports-reference

Austrian female breaststroke swimmers
Olympic swimmers of Austria
Swimmers at the 1996 Summer Olympics
1977 births
Living people
Sportspeople from Linz
21st-century Austrian women politicians
21st-century Austrian politicians